Restart is an Iranian opposition group based in California, United States. Led by Seyed Mohammad Hosseini, the group and its leader are well-known for organizing arson and vandalism, as well as advocating conspiracy theories.

Etymology 
The name Restart, is meant for using the computing term with regards to Iran. Accounts associated with the group frequently use #restartIran hashtag on social media. According to the group's leader, the name was chosen in order to make its followers "think in new ways".

Ideology and platform 
Restart seeks the toppling of the Iranian government by revolution. The group's leader maintains that "violence is the only way to overthrow the Islamic Republic". Hosseini describes the group as a "movement" and claims that it is "a form of mysticism and Sufism", thus advocating the creation of a "Sufi empire" in Iran, similar to that of Cyrus the Great. A new constitution was proposed by the group's leader, with 24 articles including right to keep and bear arms.

U.S. President Donald Trump and his policy towards Iran is praised by the group, which also supports American military action against Iran and offered to fight alongside Americans to overthrow the Iranian government. The group adopted the slogan "Make Iran Great Again" (a play on Trump's "Make America Great Again").

Restart has been compared to QAnon by Ariane Tabatabai, in terms of "conspiracist thinking going global". Among conspiracy theories advocated by the group is that Iran's Supreme Leader Ali Khamenei has died (or went into coma) in 2017 and a double plays his role in public. Hosseini claimed that based on a prediction made by 14th century figure Shah Nimatullah Wali, the Iranian government would collapse in 2018, as it "has been permitted" or "has been ordered", implicitly making a reference to an occult or supernatural authority.

Vandalism and arson 
The group instructed its members to throw Molotov cocktails and flammable liquids at banks, ATM machines, mosques, gas stations and government buildings while filming the operation. During Winter 2017, at least 20 videos of property damage incidents were attributed to the group while it claimed many more attacks (30 mosques, 500–600 banks, 200–300 ATMs and 150–180 Basiji bases across the country). On 16 October 2017, Metropolitan Police arrested two for an arson attempt against Embassy of Iran, London. The two had sprayed the word 'Restart' on the door, but were detained before setting the building on fire.

In an interview with Eli Lake, Hosseini said "We started with a color protest ... We told people to spray colors on the walls of buildings that belonged to the Basij ... Then we said there should be a fire protest, They should burn down government mosques and police stations". The reason for getting more violent, according to him was that "When the colors didn’t work that much, I switched to throwing rocks, because they didn’t talk about me. There were thousands of videos showing they threw color, but no news picked it up, so I became more aggressive. I decided to switch to throwing rocks, so that got a little attention but not enough. So I switched to throwing fire at government buildings, Basij banks and mosques that had Basij headquarters there, and banks that are stealing people’s money".

In November 2017, two members of the restart group set the office of Persepolis F.C. in Tehran on fire which injured the security guard. A video of the scene of the fire has been published on social networks, which shows that the arsonist had a companion who filmed him and said that "restart is the only way to save Iran".

In January 2018, Hosseini released an audio message, threatening the Islamic Revolutionary Guard Corps for killing its members and their families. 

In February 2018, an Iranian refugee in Australia initiated his Melbourne–Canberra walk to voice support for Restart.

In March 2018, eleven members of the group convicted of destruction of public property and propaganda, were sentenced to imprisonment in Iran.

The group has an extensive presence on the internet. Telegram banned Restart's 100K+ channel (@showman1) in October 2017. The company's CEO Pavel Durov wrote a post, stating that they have asked the owner to stop its "vandalism contest" but after being ignored, they were "left with no other option but to block". Subsequently, mirror accounts were launched on the same app.

References 

Organisations designated as terrorist by Iran
Militant opposition to the Islamic Republic of Iran
Iran–United States relations
Political organizations established in 2015
Political organizations based in the United States